The 1982 Trevira Cup was a men's tennis tournament played on indoor carpet courts in Frankfurt, West Germany that was part of the Super Series category of the 1982 Volvo Grand Prix. It was the third and last edition of the tournament and was held from 29 March until 4 April 1982. First-seeded Ivan Lendl won the singles title.

Finals

Singles
 Ivan Lendl defeated  Peter McNamara 6–2, 6–2
 It was Lendl's 6th singles title of the year and the 22nd of his career.

Doubles
 Mark Edmondson /  Steve Denton defeated  Tony Giammalva /  Tim Mayotte 6–7, 6–3, 6–3
 It was Edmondson's 5th doubles title of the year and the 18th of his career. It was Denton's 3rd doubles title of the year and the 11th of his career.

References

External links
 ITF tournament edition details

Trevira Cup
Trevira Cup